ZDS may refer to:

 Zenith Data Systems, a computer manufacturer in the 1980s
 Za dom spremni, a Croatian nationalist salute
 9,9'-Dicis-zeta-carotene desaturase, an enzyme
 Zheng Design Services, a professional architectural practice by architect Leslie Zheng
 Zaaza Design Studio, ZDS is a professional 360 advertising agency specialized in graphic design, motion graphic, web design & 3D modeling